Peter Wong Hong-yuen, GBS, OBE, JP (born 25 April 1944, Shanghai) was a member of the Legislative Council of Hong Kong (1988–95).

He was President of the Hong Kong Society of Accountants from 1984 to 1985 and was elected Legislative Councillor to represent the accountancy functional constituency from 1988 to 1995.

Wong is a member of the Hong Kong Freemasonry headquartered in the 'Zetland Hall', he was a partner of Deloitte Touche Tohmatsu.

Peter graduated from Cambridge University in 1965, and after qualifying as a Chartered Accountant, he joined his father's accounting firm Wong Tan & Co. which became Kwan Wong Tan and Fong (“KWTF”). In 1997, KWTF merged into Deloitte Touche Tohmatsu of which Peter was senior tax partner until his retirement in 2004.

His father 黃秉章 was a founding partner of "Kwan Wong Tan & Fong", which was the largest local accounting firm in Hong Kong prior to its merger with Deloitte Touche Tohmatsu in 1997. 
 His father was also Chairman of 'The Chinese Club' from 1968 to 1971.

Wong's grandfather 黃兆鎮 (a.k.a.黃子靜) is the son of Wong Ah Fook

Wong's grandfather's older brother 黃兆焜 (S.K. Wong)'s son  was a partner at the "Deacons" law firm in Hong Kong.

Peter is the Hong Kong Chairman of Landmark Trust Group and The ISF Academy.

References

1944 births
Living people
Liberal Party (Hong Kong) politicians
Liberal Democratic Federation of Hong Kong politicians
New Hong Kong Alliance politicians
Officers of the Order of the British Empire
Recipients of the Gold Bauhinia Star
HK LegCo Members 1988–1991
HK LegCo Members 1991–1995
Hong Kong accountants
Hong Kong Basic Law Consultative Committee members
Hong Kong Freemasons
Members of the Election Committee of Hong Kong, 2012–2017